Diane Setterfield (born 22 August 1964) is an English author whose 2006 debut novel, The Thirteenth Tale , became a New York Times No. 1 best-seller. she won the 2007 Quill Award, Debut author of the year, for this novel. It is written in the Gothic tradition, with echoes of Jane Eyre and Wuthering Heights. The rights were acquired by David Heyman at Heyday Films and the novel was adapted for television by Christopher Hampton. Starring Vanessa Redgrave, Olivia Colman, and Sophie Turner, The Thirteenth Tale was televised on BBC2 in December 2013.

Diane Setterfield's second novel, Bellman & Black, was published in 2013 by Emily Bestler Books/Atria in the United States and by Orion in the UK. Her third novel, Once Upon a River, was published in 2018.

Before writing, Setterfield studied French literature at the University of Bristol, earning a bachelor of arts in 1986 and a PhD in 1993. Setterfield's PhD is on "autobiographical structures in André Gide's early fiction." Setterfield taught at numerous schools as well as privately before leaving academia in the late 1990s.

Setterfield was raised in Theale. She lives in Oxford, England.

Novels
The Thirteenth Tale (2006)
Bellman & Black (2013)
Once Upon a River (2018)

References

External links
 
 Biography at Book Browse

21st-century English novelists
1964 births
Living people
Writers of Gothic fiction
English women novelists
21st-century English women writers
Alumni of the University of Bristol